Capocollo, or Capicola  or coppa is a traditional Italian, Corsican and Swiss pork cold cut (salume) made from the dry-cured muscle running from the neck to the fourth or fifth rib of the pork shoulder or neck. It is a whole-muscle salume, dry cured, and typically sliced very thin. It is similar to the more widely known cured ham or prosciutto, because they are both pork-derived cold cuts used in similar dishes. It is not brined as ham typically is.

Terminology
This cut is typically called capocollo or coppa in much of Italy and southern Switzerland (Ticino and the Grisons). This name is a compound of the words capo ("head") and collo ("neck"). Regional terms include capicollo (Campania and Calabria) and capicollu (Corsica).

Outside of Europe, terms include Bondiola sandwich or bondiola curada in Argentina, Paraguay, and Uruguay, and capicola or capicolla in North America. The pronunciation "gabagool" has been used by Italian Americans in the New York City area and elsewhere in the Northeast US, based on the Neapolitan language word "capecuollo" (IPA /kapəˈkwol.lə/) in working-class strata of 19th- and early 20th-century. It was notably used in the television series The Sopranos, and its use has become a well-known stereotype.

Manufacture and use
In its production, capocollo is first lightly seasoned often with red and sometimes white wine, garlic, and a variety of herbs and spices that differs depending on region. The meat is then salted (and was traditionally massaged), stuffed into a natural casing, and hung for up to six months to cure. Sometimes the exterior is rubbed with hot paprika before being hung and cured. Capocollo is essentially the pork counterpart of the air-dried, cured beef bresaola. It is widely available wherever significant Italian communities occur, due to commercially produced varieties. The slow-roasted Piedmontese version is called coppa cotta.

Capocollo is esteemed for its delicate flavor and tender, fatty texture, and is often more expensive than most other salumi. In many countries, it is sold as a gourmet food item. It is usually sliced thin for use in antipasti or sandwiches such as muffulettas, Italian grinders and subs, and panini, as well as some traditional Italian pizza.

Varieties and official status

Two particular varieties, Coppa Piacentina and Capocollo di Calabria, have Protected Designation of Origin status under the Common Agricultural Policy of European Union law, which ensures that only products genuinely originating in those regions are allowed in commerce as such.

Five additional Italian regions produce capocollo, and are not covered under European law, but are designated as "Prodotto agroalimentare tradizionale" by the Italian Ministry of Agricultural, Food, and Forestry Policies:

 Capocollo della Basilicata;
 Capocollo del Lazio;
Capocollo di Martina Franca is a traditional capocollo of Apulia. It is smoked with laurel leaves, thyme, almonds, Mediterranean herbs and pieces of bark of Macedonian oak (called fragno in Italian), a tree typical of Southeastern Italy, the Balkans and Western Turkey.  Usually it is served with figs;
 Capocollo tipico senese  or finocchiata, from Tuscany;
 Capocollo dell'Umbria;

Outside Europe, capocollo was introduced to Argentina by Italian immigrants, under the names bondiola or bondiola curada.

See also

 List of dried foods

References

Further reading

Lunch meat
Dried meat
Italian cuisine
Italian products with protected designation of origin
Pork
Salumi